The 1934 South Carolina Gamecocks football team was an American football team that represented the University of South Carolina as a member of the Southern Conference (SoCon) during the 1934 college football season. In their seventh season under head coach Billy Laval, South Carolina compiled an overall record of 5–4 with a mark of 232 in conference play, placing seventh in the SoCon. On September 29, 1934 South Carolina defeated Erskine 20–0 in the first ever game in Carolina Municipal Stadium.

Schedule

References

South Carolina
South Carolina Gamecocks football seasons
South Carolina Gamecocks football